Omar Monterde Villaescusa (born 24 March 1989) is a Spanish footballer who plays as a left winger for Zamora. He has played in the Segunda División for Alcoyano and in the Polish I liga for Bytovia Bytów.

Club career
On 3 August 2020, he joined Zamora.

References

External links

1989 births
Living people
Footballers from Valencia (city)
Spanish footballers
Association football wingers
Segunda División players
Segunda División B players
Tercera División players
I liga players
II liga players
Atlético Levante UD players
Levante UD footballers
CD Alcoyano footballers
Valencia CF Mestalla footballers
UD Melilla footballers
CD Castellón footballers
Bytovia Bytów players
Lincoln Red Imps F.C. players
GKS Tychy players
Olimpia Grudziądz players
Zamora CF footballers
Spanish expatriate footballers
Expatriate footballers in Poland
Expatriate footballers in Gibraltar
Spanish expatriate sportspeople in Poland
Spanish expatriate sportspeople in Gibraltar